= Hacksneck, Virginia =

Unincorporated community in Virginia, United States

Coordinates: 37°38′35″N 75°52′14″W

Hack's Neck is an unincorporated community in Accomack County, Virginia, United States.
